Hagi Ōkan (萩往還) is a Japanese highway completed in the Edo period (1603-1868). It is 53 km in length and extends from the castle town of Hagi (萩市), capital of the old Nagato Province (長門州) to Mitajiri of old Suo Province (today's Hofu City). Hagi is on the Sea of Japan (日本海) and the highway crosses the Chugoku Mountain Range to Hofu on the Inland Sea of Japan (瀬戸内海).

Summary 
Parts of the highway existed before the Edo Period, but in 1604, after defeat at the Battle of Sekigahara (1600), the powerful Mori family were demoted. Their control had been based in Hiroshima and extended across the entire Western end of Honshu. As punishment for siding against Tokugawa Ieyasu at the Battle of Sekigahara, the extent of their Choshu Province was reduced to just the smaller Western tip of Honshu, with their castletown located in Hagi. They subsequently built a 4 metre-wide major highway from Hagi to the Inland Sea. A signboard in Karahi Town in central Hagi is the start of the highway. It passes through the post-towns of Akaragi, Sasanami, Yamaguchi, and Mitajiri. It was a major access way from Hagi to the main Saigoku Highway (Sanyodo Highway). The Feudal Lord of Hagi used it to travel to Edo each year to pay his respects to the Shogun. It was also a major trade link from Hagi Port on the Sea of Japan to Nakanoseki Port (Mitajiri) on the Inland Sea of Japan.

Hagi Ōkan was well built with steeper sections paved, intermediary tea houses, Ichirzuka (4 km) distance markers, and Pine Trees lining the highway. At the end of the Edo Period, it was famously used by young warriors travelling towards Edo to strategize against and eventually bring about the downfall of the Shogunate. After the Meiji Restoration (1868) users declined and the highway fell into disuse.  Some of the steeper mountain sections were abandoned.

Today 
Today much of the old Hagi Ōkan has been built over by the modern National Highway 262 (the section between Yamaguchi and Sasanami is Prefectural Highway 62). This modern highway is an important link between Hagi City, Yamaguchi City and Hofu City. Parts of the old road around Akaragi and Sasanami remain in the original state or have been rebuilt in the original state. A program to restore these sections began in 1977. In 1989 the full length of the Highway and its related historical places was given Heritage Listing.

In 1996, the highway was listed as one of the "100 Historical Highways of Japan" by the Agency for Cultural Affairs. In 2004, the section from Hagi to Yamaguchi was listed as one of the "500 Roads to Walk in Japan", and in 2007, it was listed as one of the "Beautiful Japanese Highways".

Related Historical Sites

Hagi City 

 Karahi Town Notice Board: located in central Hagi, it is the start of the Highway. This type of notice board was located at the entrance to Post-towns and was the main method for the Samurai to communicate laws and notifications to the commoners. Karahi's notice board was dismantled in the early Meiji Restoration but in 2010 a large-scale impressive replica was constructed.

 Namida-Matsu (Weeping Pine Trees): Pine trees lined the entire length of the Highway, placed every 4 metres. "Namida-Matsu" refer to a group of pines lining the highway at the entrance to Hagi. Departing Hagi travellers would weep with sadness for leaving Hagi, and on return would weep for joy. A poem monument by Yoshida Shoin relates to his being sent to Edo after the Ansei Rebellion. Yoshida was one of the great intellectuals of the late Edo Period who instructed many of the young warriors who would eventually take on important roles in the new Meiji Government. He was eventually executed for his anti-Shogunate, progressive thinking in 1859 at the young age of 29. He was born in Hagi.
 Kasega-saka Ichirizuka Distance Mound: the first distance mound (approximately 4km) from the Karahi Notice Board.
 Issho-Dani Valley Ishi-Datami (stone paving): built in a steep valley where rain would often wash away the road. The cobblestones were laid down through the valley to protect the road. A small section 38m long and 1m wide remains. The name of the valley comes from the fact that to climb the valley would take the time taken to eat 1.8kg (Issho) of fried beans. The original section of "Ishi-Datami" is 1 metre wide. The border stones are straight-edged and arranged evenly while the filler stones are very irregular.
 Ochiai Stone Bridge: This bridge is located at the mid-way point of the highway and crosses the Ochiai River, a major tributary to the Sasanami River. It is 2.4m long and 1.7m wide. It is of "Hanebashi" construction (a Japanese bridge construction method unique to Edo period Japan). It is a registered heritage structure. "Hanebashi" have a supporting stone stuck into the side of the river bank and weighted down these stones provide the base for the bridge strone.

Yamaguchi City 
Eight Prime Ministers have come from Yamaguchi, including Japan's first, Ito Hironobu who was Prime Minister three times. Of the eight, five were Prime Minister during the Meiji Era. The current prime minister, Abe Shinzo, who is 90th, 96th, 97th and 98th Prime Minister is also from Yamaguchi.

 Provincial Border Marker: A granite pillar marks the border of Nagato Province Abu-gun and Suo Province Yoshiki-gun. The pillar was carved in 1808 but existed since at least a mapping survey completed in the 1750s.  
 Rokken Chaya Remains (the remains of the six tea houses): Today's buildings are a recreation of the Feudal Lord's Resting Place. They sit at the top of Ichi-no-Saka Hill or "the toughest hill in Yamaguchi".  It is one is the most difficult climbs on the Hagi Ōukan and comes at the top of the "42 switchbacks". It was the location of the "Feudal Lords Palanquin Resting Place" and the recreation includes two sand pits where the Feudal Lord's Palanquin and its backup would have rested. A raised sitting area is where the feudal lord rested. The current recreation has relied on a diagram of the area from the Edo Period.
 Naganobori Copper Mine: The mine was first opened in the Nara Period (8th century) to supply copper for the construction of the Great Buddha at Nara. It took 20 days to transport the copper from the Mine to the local port and across the Inland Sea to Nara.

Hofu City 

 Koube Family Miyaichi Honjin: The Miyaichi Honjin was an inn which acted as the Honjin from 1642 until Meiji (1868). Feudal Lords from all over the West of Japan would use this inn. It was available to high-ranked Shogunate officials. It was designated a Cultural Heritage site associated with the Hagi Ōukan in 1989. In 2012 the front gate and garden were added to the cultural register. The building was first constructed by the Koube Family, a wealthy trading family, and reconstructed after its destruction by "The Great Fire of 1789". The building was lost again to fire in 2011. Archaeological work is being conducted and while this is proceeding only the front gate is viewable.
 Mitajiri Tea House Remains: The tea house was built by the Second Generation Mori Tsunahiro. It was used for official Provincial work such as annual attendance to Edo and inspection tours of the Province. The feudal lord travelling on the Hagi Ōukan would board a ship at this point and so it is formally the terminus of the Hagi Ōukan. It was registered as a Hagi Ōukan related cultural heritage in 1989.
 Remains of the Feudal Lords' boat sheds: The Mori Navy had been very active during the Warring States Period and in 1611 settled here in its new form as shipping services for the Feudal Lord. The facility included docks for storing, repairing and building ships. All of the facilities were abandoned in the Meiji Era and all that remains are some channel and dock stone walls.

References

Other Resources 

 萩往還 — Initial draft translated from the Japanese Wikipedia entry

Edo period
Footpaths
Roads in Yamaguchi Prefecture
Hagi, Yamaguchi